David Russell Strathairn (born January 26, 1949) is an American actor. Known for his leading roles on stage and screen, he has often portrayed historical figures such as Edward R. Murrow, J. Robert Oppenheimer, William H. Seward, and John Dos Passos. He has received various accolades including an Independent Spirit Award, a Primetime Emmy Award, and a Volpi Cup, and has been nominated for an Academy Award, a BAFTA Award, two Golden Globe Awards, and four Screen Actors Guild Awards.

Strathairn made his acting debut in his fellow Williams College graduate John Sayles' film Return of the Secaucus 7 (1980). He continued acting in films such as Matewan (1987), Eight Men Out (1988), City of Hope (1991), A League of Their Own (1992), Sneakers (1992), Passion Fish (1992), The Firm (1993), The River Wild (1995), L.A. Confidential (1997), and Limbo (1999). Strathairn gained prominence for his portrayal as journalist Edward R. Murrow in George Clooney's Good Night, and Good Luck (2005), for which he was nominated for an Academy Award for Best Actor. He is also recognized for his role as CIA Deputy Director Noah Vosen in The Bourne Ultimatum (2007), and The Bourne Legacy (2012). He appeared in Steven Spielberg's Lincoln (2012), Chloe Zhao's Nomadland (2020), and Guillermo del Toro's Nightmare Alley (2021).
 
Also known for his lengthy work on television, he made his debut in the soap opera Search for Tomorrow in 1984. He portrayed Robert Wegler in the acclaimed HBO drama series The Sopranos (2004). He received a Primetime Emmy Award win and a Golden Globe Award nomination for his performance in the HBO television film Temple Grandin (2010). He portrayed John Dos Passos in the HBO film Hemingway & Gellhorn (2012). He's had recurring roles in the Syfy series Alphas (2011-2012), the NBC series The Blacklist (2015-2016), the Showtime series Billions (2017-2019), and the SyFy, then Amazon Prime Video, series The Expanse (2018 - 2019).

Early life and education
Strathairn was born in San Francisco, California, the second of three children of Thomas Scott Strathairn, Jr., a physician, and Mary Frances (née Frazier), a nurse. He is of Scottish descent through his paternal grandfather, Thomas Scott Strathairn, a native of Crieff, and of Native Hawaiian ancestry through his paternal grandmother, Josephine Lei Victoria Alana. Strathairn attended Redwood High School in Larkspur, California, and graduated from Williams College in Williamstown, Massachusetts, in 1970. At Williams, he met fellow actor Gordon Clapp and director John Sayles, with whom he has collaborated on a number of projects.

He studied clowning at the Ringling Brothers and Barnum & Bailey Clown College in Venice, Florida, and briefly worked as a clown in a traveling circus.

Career

Strathairn was nominated for an Academy Award for his stirring portrayal of CBS newsman Edward R. Murrow in the 2005 biographical film Good Night, and Good Luck. The film explored Murrow's clash with Senator Joseph McCarthy over McCarthy's Communist witch-hunts in the 1950s. Strathairn also received Best Actor Golden Globe and Screen Actors Guild (SAG) nominations for his performance. In 2010, he won the Primetime Emmy Award for Outstanding Supporting Actor in a Miniseries or a Movie for his portrayal of Dr. Carlock in the HBO television film Temple Grandin. For that role, he also won the Satellite Award for Best Supporting Actor – Series, Miniseries or Television Film and was nominated for a Golden Globe Award for Best Supporting Actor – Series, Miniseries or Television Film.

Other notable film roles include his portrayals of the title character in Harrison's Flowers (2000); Col. Craig Harrington in Memphis Belle (1990); Whistler, the wisecracking blind techie, in Sneakers (1992); convict Ray McDeere in the legal thriller The Firm (1993); abusive husband Joe St. George in Dolores Claiborne (1995); Pierce Patchett, a millionaire involved in the seedy side of 1950s Los Angeles in L.A. Confidential (1997); Theseus, Duke of Athens, in the 1999 version of A Midsummer Night's Dream; and baseball player Eddie Cicotte in Eight Men Out (1988).

Strathairn is a character actor, appearing in supporting roles in many independent and Hollywood films. In this capacity, he has co-starred in Twisted as a psychiatrist; in The River Wild as a husband; and in Blue Car as a teacher.

He has worked with his Williams College classmate and director John Sayles. He made his film debut in Return of the Secaucus 7, and worked in the films Passion Fish, Matewan, Limbo and City of Hope, for which he won the Independent Spirit Award. Alongside Sayles, he played one of the "men in black" in the 1983 film The Brother from Another Planet. Strathairn created the role of Edwin Booth with Maryann Plunkett in a workshop production of Booth! A House Divided, by W. Stuart McDowell, at The Players in New York City.

Strathairn's television work also includes a wide range of roles: Moss, the bookselling nebbish on the critically acclaimed The Days and Nights of Molly Dodd; Captain Keller, the father of Helen Keller in the 2000 remake of The Miracle Worker; Capt. Frederick Benteen, a U.S. 7th Cavalry officer under General Custer's command in Son of the Morning Star; and a far-out (both figuratively and literally) televangelist in Paradise, the pilot episode for a TV series on Showtime that was not successful. Strathairn had a recurring role on the hit television drama The Sopranos. Strathairn starred in the Miami Vice episode "Out Where the Buses Don't Run."

Strathairn appeared in We Are Marshall, a 2006 film about the rebirth of Marshall University's football program after the 1970 plane crash that killed most of the team's members; and Cold Souls, starring Paul Giamatti as a fictionalized version of himself, who enlists a company's services to deep freeze his soul, directed by Sophie Barthes. In 2006 he did a campaign ad for then congressional candidate (now Senator) Kirsten Gillibrand. He reprised his role as Edward R. Murrow in a speech similar to the one from Good Night, and Good Luck, but was altered to reference Gillibrand's opponent John Sweeney.

Strathairn plays the lead role in the 2007 independent film, Steel Toes, a film by David Gow (writer/co-director/producer) and Mark Adam (co-director/DOP/editor). The film is based on Gow's stage play Cherry Docs, in which Strathairn starred for its American premiere at the Wilma Theatre in Philadelphia.

He played a role in Paramount Pictures' children's film The Spiderwick Chronicles (2008) as Arthur Spiderwick. Strathairn appeared in the American Experience PBS anthology series documentary, The Trials of J. Robert Oppenheimer, a biography of the physicist. He first played Oppenheimer in the 1989 CBS TV movie Day One. He plays William Flynn, an FBI agent dealing with anarchism in 1920s New York City, in No God, No Master.

In 2009, Strathairn performed in The People Speak, a documentary feature film that uses dramatic and musical performances of the letters, diaries, and speeches of everyday Americans. It was adapted from the historian Howard Zinn's A People's History of the United States.

He starred as Dr. Lee Rosen on Syfy's series Alphas.

In 2018-19, Strathairn appeared on the third and fourth seasons of SyFy's The Expanse as Klaes Ashford.

In 2020, Strathairn was one of the few genuine actors in the Oscar-winner Nomadland, directed by Chloé Zhao. David appears alongside his son Tay, the first time they have acted together on screen since 1988's Eight Men Out when Tay was just eight years old.

Strathairn stars in the upcoming film Remember This, based on the stage play about the life of a Polish diplomat and war hero Jan Karski. The film is executive-produced by Eva Anisko and directed by Jeff Hutchens and Derek Goldman.

Theater
Strathairn is also a stage actor and has performed over 30 theatrical roles. He performed several roles in stage plays by Harold Pinter. He played Stanley in two consecutive New York Classic Stage Company (CSC) productions of Pinter's 1957 play The Birthday Party, directed by Carey Perloff (since 1992 artistic director of the American Conservatory Theater), in 1988 and 1989; the dual roles of prison Officer and Prisoner in Pinter's 1989 play Mountain Language (in a double bill with the second CSC Rep production of The Birthday Party); Edwin Booth in a workshop production by W. Stuart McDowell at The Players in 1989; Kerner, in Tom Stoppard's Hapgood (1994); and Devlin, opposite Lindsay Duncan's Rebecca, in Pinter's 1996 two-hander Ashes to Ashes in the 1999 New York premiere by the Roundabout Theatre Company.

In 2015 Strathairn appeared in Anton Chekov's The Cherry Orchard with Mary McDonnell at People's Light theater in Malvern, Pennsylvania. He lent his voice talents to an adaptation in the form of a radio play of Sinclair Lewis' It Can't Happen Here by the Berkeley Repertory Theatre in October 2020.

Strathairn plays Jan Karski in the one-man play Remember This: The Lesson of Jan Karski, written by Clark Young and Derek Goldman. The play is an original production by The Laboratory for Global Performance and Politics at Georgetown University. In 2021, Strathairn garnered critical acclaim for a production of Remember This at the Chicago Shakespeare Theater.

Personal life
Strathairn narrated a biographical video to introduce Barack Obama before his acceptance speech at the 2008 Democratic National Convention.

Strathairn's son Tay Strathairn was keyboardist for the band Dawes.

Filmography

Film

Television

Theatre

Music videos

Awards and nominations

References

External links
 
 

1949 births
Living people
20th-century American male actors
21st-century American male actors
American male film actors
American male stage actors
American male television actors
American people of Native Hawaiian descent
American people of Scottish descent
Independent Spirit Award for Best Supporting Male winners
Outstanding Performance by a Supporting Actor in a Miniseries or Movie Primetime Emmy Award winners
Male actors from California
Male actors from San Francisco
Native Hawaiian male actors
Volpi Cup for Best Actor winners
Williams College alumni
Redwood High School (Larkspur, California) alumni